The Hochalp is a mountain of the Appenzell Alps, located south of Urnäsch in the canton of Appenzell Ausserrhoden.

References

External links
Hochalp on Hikr

Mountains of the Alps
Mountains of Switzerland
Mountains of Appenzell Ausserrhoden
Appenzell Alps
One-thousanders of Switzerland